Scandal at the Fledermaus (German: Skandal um die Fledermaus) is a 1936 German comedy film directed by Herbert Selpin and starring Viktor de Kowa, Maria Andergast and Adele Sandrock. It was shot at the Terra Studios in Berlin. The film's sets were designed by the art director Erich Czerwonski. It was partly shot on location in London. It is also known by the alternative title Scandal Over Mary.

Synospsi
In England a bat flies into a young lady's bedroom, leading to string of misunderstandings.

Cast
 Viktor de Kowa as Viktor Kendal 
 Maria Andergast as Mary Hill 
 Adele Sandrock as Lady Bethy Malison 
 Heinz Salfner as Sir Thomas Berkham 
 Ernst Dumcke as Sir Anthony Garring 
 Alfred Abel as Patrick, Butler 
 Erich Fiedler as Jonny Dunn 
 Eliza Illiard as Evelyne Dixon 
 Max Gülstorff as Die Exzellenz 
 Roma Bahn as Lady X 
 Eva Tinschmann as Lady Y 
 Hedi Heising as Luise 
 Helmut Weiss as Diener 
 Ernst Stimmel as Kanzleidiener 
 Horst Teetzmann as Boy 
 Fred Goebel as Gast 
 Achim von Biel as Gast 
 Alfred Pussert as Gast

References

Bibliography
 Bergfelder, Tim & Bock, Hans-Michael. The Concise Cinegraph: Encyclopedia of German. Berghahn Books, 2009.
 Klaus, Ulrich J. Deutsche Tonfilme: Jahrgang 1936. Klaus-Archiv, 1988.
 Rentschler, Eric. The Ministry of Illusion: Nazi Cinema and Its Afterlife''. Harvard University Press, 1996.

External links

1936 films
1936 comedy films
German comedy films
Films of Nazi Germany
1930s German-language films
Films directed by Herbert Selpin
Films set in England
Films shot in London
Films set in London
German black-and-white films
1930s German films
Films shot at Terra Studios
Terra Film films